Agelasta birmanica is a species of beetle in the family Cerambycidae. It was described by Stephan von Breuning in 1935. It is known from Myanmar, Laos, Vietnam, and Thailand.

References

birmanica
Beetles described in 1935